Seaforth (2021 population: 2,673) is a Southern Ontario community in the municipality of Huron East, in Huron County, Ontario, Canada.

History
Originally known as Four Corners and Steene's Corners after an early settler, much of the area of what is now Seaforth was acquired by brothers Christopher and George Sparling in anticipation of the construction of the Buffalo, Brantford and Goderich Railway. Developer James Patton of Barrie purchased the land and laid out a townsite in 1855. The name 'Seaforth' may be derived from the Scottish Seaforth Highlanders regiment or Loch Seaforth in the Outer Hebrides of Scotland.

A post office was established in Seaforth in 1859. Incorporation as a Village followed in 1868 and as a Town in 1874. In 2001, Seaforth was amalgamated with Brussels, Grey Township, McKillop Township and Tuckersmith Township to form the Municipality of Huron East.

In September 1876, at two o'clock in the morning, a fire broke out in Mrs. Griffith's Candy and Grocery Store, raging through Main Street and destroying  of the business section. The town rebounded and Main Street was rebuilt with the brick and block structures which stand today.

Seaforth's Main Street was designated in 1984 as a Heritage Conservation District because of its distinguished late 19th-century architecture. This architectural composition of two-storey brick buildings is unique in its uniformity of scale and character. Through grants and local support, property owners have been encouraged to restore and preserve the architectural characteristics of their buildings so that this valuable resource may continue to be an asset to the community in the years ahead, and be a comforting reminder of Seaforth's history.

In many ways, Seaforth is the quintessential small Ontario town. The Victorian streetscape stands as a testament to the town's rich history and all the image and influences that make rural Ontario and its hierarchy of small urban centres unique.

Local attractions
The Main Street is one of the province's finest examples of commercial architecture from the nineteenth century.

The Van Egmond Reserve
Built by the eldest son of Colonel Anthony Van Egmond in 1846, it represents an example of Georgian architecture and Classical Revival styles. The house was restored with assistance from the Ontario Heritage Trust. The bricks were handmade on the property. Their variance in colour in the exterior walls is an indication that the home was built over an extended period of time, their difference in colour being a result of the varying conditions under which successive loads of bricks were fired during the course of construction.
The house and grounds were saved in the early 1970s from demolition and a housing development by a group of community volunteers. Funds were raised to purchase the property and restore it to how it might have been prior to 1867. It was recognized as an Ontario Heritage property and signs indicative of that direct travelers to the Reserve. The Province of Ontario supported the restoration of the property and will become its owners should the local Van Egmond Foundation discontinue its work to ensure the property is safe and open to the public, in the summer and for special events.  The Foundation continues to raise funds and to ensure the property is recognized as a local resource attempting to preserve the history of the early settlement and development of the region. Overlooking the Bayfield River, the grounds are a rural retreat offering a quiet spot for a picnic.

Local media
The Huron Expositor
The local radio stations are CHWC-FM, CKNX-FM, and 94.5 The Bull.

Notable people

Jim Balsillie (born 1961), billionaire philanthropist and former co-CEO of BlackBerry manufacturer Research In Motion
John Melady, Canadian non-fiction author
Richard Nesbitt (born 1955), CEO of the Toronto Stock Exchange

Historical figures 
H. Isabel Graham (1869–1941), poet
Howard Hillen Kerr (1900–1984), first principal of what was then Ryerson Polytechnical Institute.
Charlie Mason (1912–1971), former NHL player with the New York Rangers, Detroit Red Wings and Chicago Blackhawks.
Ron Mason (1940–2016), former hockey coach with Lake Superior State University, Bowling Green University and Michigan State University. Also former MSU Athletic Director. Inducted into the United States Hockey Hall of Fame in 2013.
 Colonel Anthony Van Egmond (1778–1838), first farmer in the Huron Tract. Participant in Upper Canada Rebellion.
Cooney Weiland (1904–1985), former NHL player with the Boston Bruins, Ottawa Senators and Detroit Red Wings. Also former head coach with the NHL Boston Bruins. Inducted into the Hockey Hall of Fame in 1971.

Contemporary sports figures 
Boyd Devereaux, former NHL player with the Edmonton Oilers, Detroit Red Wings, Phoenix Coyotes and Toronto Maple Leafs. Member of the Detroit Red Wings 2002 Stanley Cup Championship team.
Scott Driscoll, former Linesman in the NHL.
Arden Eddie, former Iron Man participant, team owner and manager in the Intercounty Baseball League.
Lloyd Eisler, former Canadian pair skater. Along with skating partner Isabelle Brasseur, the pair were the 1992 and 1994 Olympic bronze medalist and the 1993 World Champion. Inducted into Canada's Sports Hall of Fame in 1996.
Dave McLlwain, former NHL player with the Pittsburgh Penguins, Winnipeg Jets, New York Islanders, Buffalo Sabres, Toronto Maple Leafs and Ottawa Senators.
Pat Murray - Former NHL player with the Philadelphia Flyers. Brother to Rem.
Rem Murray, former NHL player with the Edmonton Oilers, New York Rangers and Nashville Predators. Brother to Pat.
Derek Nesbitt, professional hockey player with the Atlanta Gladiators of the ECHL.
Cal O'Reilly, NHL player with the Nashville Predators, Phoenix Coyotes, Pittsburgh Penguins, Buffalo Sabres and Minnesota Wild. Brother to Ryan.
Ryan O'Reilly, NHL player with the Colorado Avalanche, Buffalo Sabres and St. Louis Blues. Member of the St. Louis Blues 2019 Stanley Cup Championship team. Conn Smythe Trophy winner as the Most Valuable Player of the 2019 Stanley Cup Playoffs. Brother to Cal.
Evelyn Walsh, former No. 1-ranked Canadian junior pairs figure skater; No. 5 worldwide
Mike Watt, former NHL player with the Edmonton Oilers, New York Islanders, Nashville Predators and Carolina Hurricanes.

Politicians 
 Clare Westcott, former Judge and Chair of the Metro Toronto Police Commission

References

External links

Huron East webpage about Seaforth

Communities in Huron County, Ontario
Former towns in Ontario
Populated places disestablished in 2001